The Emu War, also known as the Great Emu War, was a nuisance wildlife management military operation undertaken in Australia over the later part of 1932 to address public concern over the number of emus said to be running amok and destroying crops in the Campion district within the Wheatbelt of Western Australia. The unsuccessful attempts to curb the population of emus, a large flightless bird indigenous to Australia, employed Royal Australian Artillery soldiers armed with Lewis guns—leading the media to adopt the name "Emu War" when referring to the incident. While a number of the birds were killed, the emu population persisted and continued to cause crop destruction.

Background

Following World War I, large numbers of discharged veterans who served in the war were given land by the Australian government to take up farming within Western Australia, often in agriculturally marginal areas. With the onset of the Great Depression in 1929, these farmers were encouraged to increase their wheat crops, with the government promising—and failing to deliver—assistance in the form of subsidies. In spite of the recommendations and the promised subsidies, wheat prices continued to fall, and by October 1932 matters were becoming intense, with the farmers preparing to harvest the season's crop while simultaneously threatening to refuse to deliver the wheat.

The difficulties facing farmers were increased by the arrival of as many as 20,000 emus. Emus regularly migrate after their breeding season, heading to the coast from the inland regions. With the cleared land and additional water supplies being made available for livestock by the Western Australian farmers, the emus found that the cultivated lands were good habitat, and they began to foray into farm territory—in particular the marginal farming land around Chandler and Walgoolan. The emus consumed and spoiled the crops and left large gaps in fences where rabbits could enter and cause further problems.

Farmers relayed their concerns about the birds ravaging their crops, and a deputation of ex-soldiers were sent to meet with the Minister of Defence, Sir George Pearce. Having served in World War I, the soldier-settlers were well aware of the effectiveness of machine guns, and they requested their deployment. The minister readily agreed, although with conditions attached: the guns were to be used by military personnel, troop transport was to be financed by the Western Australian government, and the farmers would provide food, accommodation, and payment for the ammunition. Pearce also supported the deployment on the grounds that the birds would make good target practice, while it has also been argued that some in the government may have viewed the operation as a way of being seen to be helping the Western Australian farmers, to stave off the secession movement that was brewing. Towards that end, a cinematographer from Fox Movietone was enlisted.

The "war" 

Military involvement was due to begin in October 1932. The "war" was conducted under the command of Major Gwynydd Purves Wynne-Aubrey Meredith of the Seventh Heavy Battery of the Royal Australian Artillery, with Meredith commanding soldiers Sergeant S. McMurray and Gunner J. O'Halloran, armed with two Lewis guns and 10,000 rounds of ammunition. The operation was delayed, however, by a period of rainfall that caused the emus to scatter over a wider area. The rain ceased by 2 November 1932, whereupon the troops were deployed with orders to assist the farmers and, according to a newspaper account, to collect 100 emu skins so that their feathers could be used to make hats for light horsemen.

First attempt
On 2 November, the men travelled to Campion, where some 50 emus were sighted. As the birds were out of range of the guns, the local settlers attempted to herd the emus into an ambush, but the birds split into small groups and ran so that they were difficult to target. Nevertheless, while the first fusillade from the machine guns was ineffective due to the range, a second round of gunfire was able to kill "a number" of birds. Later the same day a small flock was encountered, and "perhaps a dozen" birds were killed.

The next significant event was on 4 November. Meredith had established an ambush near a local dam, and more than 1,000 emus were spotted heading towards their position. This time the gunners waited until the birds were in close proximity before opening fire. The gun jammed after only twelve birds were killed and the remainder scattered before any more could be shot. No more birds were sighted that day.

In the days that followed, Meredith chose to move further south, where the birds were "reported to be fairly tame", but there was only limited success in spite of his efforts. By the fourth day of the campaign, army observers noted that "each pack seems to have its own leader now—a big black-plumed bird which stands fully six feet high and keeps watch while his mates carry out their work of destruction and warns them of our approach". At one stage Meredith even went so far as to mount one of the guns on a truck, a move that proved to be ineffective, as the truck was unable to gain on the birds, and the ride was so rough that the gunner was unable to fire any shots. By 8 November, six days after the first engagement, 2,500 rounds of ammunition had been fired. The number of birds killed is uncertain: one account estimates that it was 50 birds, but other accounts range from 200 to 500, the latter figure being provided by the settlers. Meredith's official report noted that his men had suffered no casualties.

Summarising the culls, ornithologist Dominic Serventy commented:

On 8 November, members in the Australian House of Representatives discussed the operation. Following the negative coverage of the events in the local media, that included claims that "only a few" emus had died, Pearce withdrew the military personnel and the guns on 8 November.

After the withdrawal, Major Meredith compared the emus to Zulus and commented on the striking manoeuvrability of the emus, even while badly wounded.

Second attempt 

After the withdrawal of the military, the emu attacks on crops continued. Farmers again asked for support, citing the hot weather and drought that brought emus invading farms in the thousands. James Mitchell, the Premier of Western Australia lent his strong support to renewal of the military assistance. At the same time, a report from the Base Commander was issued that indicated 300 emus had been killed in the initial operation.

Acting on the requests and the Base Commander's report, by 12 November the Minister of Defence approved a resumption of military efforts. He defended the decision in the Senate, explaining why the soldiers were necessary to combat the serious agricultural threat of the large emu population. Although the military had agreed to lend the guns to the Western Australian government on the expectation that they would provide the necessary people, Meredith was once again placed in the field due to an apparent lack of experienced machine gunners in the state.

Taking to the field on 13 November 1932, the military found a degree of success over the first two days, with approximately 40 emus killed. The third day, 15 November, proved to be far less successful, but by 2 December the soldiers were killing approximately 100 emus per week. Meredith was recalled on 10 December, and in his report he claimed 986 kills with 9,860 rounds, at a rate of exactly 10 rounds per confirmed kill. In addition, Meredith claimed 2,500 wounded birds had died as a result of the injuries that they had sustained. In assessing the success of the cull, an article in the Coolgardie Miner on 23 August 1935 reported that although the use of machine guns had been "criticised in many quarters, the method proved effective and saved what remained of the wheat".

Aftermath 
Despite the problems encountered with the cull, the farmers of the region once again requested military assistance in 1934, 1943, and 1948, only to be turned down by the government. Instead, the bounty system that had been instigated in 1923 was continued, and this proved to be effective: 57,034 bounties were claimed over a six-month period in 1934.

By December 1932, word of the Emu War had spread, reaching the United Kingdom. Some conservationists there protested the cull as "extermination of the rare emu". Dominic Serventy and Hubert Whittell, the eminent Australian ornithologists, described the "war" as "an attempt at the mass destruction of the birds".

Throughout 1930 and onward, exclusion barrier fencing became a popular means of keeping emus out of agricultural areas (in addition to other vermin, such as dingoes and rabbits).

In November 1950, Hugh Leslie raised the issues of emus in federal parliament and urged Army Minister Josiah Francis to release a quantity of .303 ammunition from the army for the use of farmers. The minister approved the release of 500,000 rounds of ammunition.

Legacy 
In 2019, a musical adaptation of the story was workshopped in Melbourne by playwright Simeon Yialeloglou and composer James Court. An action-comedy movie retelling of the events, written by John Cleese, Monty Franklin, and Rob Schneider, was originally slated for release in 2022, now scheduled to begin production in 2023.

See also 
 Brumby shooting
 Four Pests Campaign
 Rabbits in Australia

References

External links
 How we lost the "Emu War"
 Plants & Animals: Emu
 

1932 in Australia
1932 in military history
Agriculture in Western Australia
Dromaius
History of agriculture in Australia
Non-combat military operations involving Australia
November 1932 events
December 1932 events
1930s in Western Australia
Emus